William Beattie may refer to:

William Beattie (physician) (1793–1875), Scottish physician and poet
William Beattie (politician) (born 1942), former minister and Unionist politician in Northern Ireland
Bill Beattie (Australian politician) (1912–2006), Australian politician
William Beattie (rugby league) ( 1889–1917), Scottish rugby league footballer of the 1910s
William George Beattie (1841–1918), English locomotive engineer
William John Beattie, founder and former leader of the Canadian Nazi Party
William Hamilton Beattie (1842–1898), Scottish architect
William Francis Beattie (1886–1918), Scottish sculptor
William Beattie (photographer) (1864–1931), New Zealand photographer
Bill Beattie (photographer) (1902–1991), New Zealand photographer

See also
William Beatty (disambiguation)